Thomas Wyatt may refer to:

 Thomas Wyatt (poet) (1503–1542), English poet
 Thomas Wyatt the Younger (1521–1554), rebel leader and a central character in Sir Thomas Wyatt, history play by John Webster and Thomas Dekker
 Thomas Henry Wyatt (1807–1880), British architect
 Thomas Wyatt Turner (1877–1978), American civil rights activist, biologist and educator
 Thomas Wyatt (painter) (1799–1859), English portrait-painter